Slices of Life (Tranches de vie) is a 1985 French comedy-sci fi film directed by François Leterrier. It is based on Gérard Lauzier's comic strip of the same name.

Plot
The film is a series of sketches

Cast

 Laura Antonelli as Monica Belli
 Michel Boujenah as Michel Lambert
 Josiane Balasko as Madame Dupuis
 Jean-Pierre Cassel as The Earl of Forcheville
 Christian Clavier as Charles-Henri
 Marie-Anne Chazel as Béatrice
 Ginette Garcin as Béatrice's mother
 Roland Giraud as Jean
 Pierre Mondy as The President
 Gérard Jugnot as Malounian
 Jean-Pierre Darroussin as The journalist
 Annie Grégorio as The journalist
 Daniel Prévost as TV Host
 Pierre Richard as Dubois
 Barbara Nielsen as Marianna
 Martin Lamotte as Alain
 Jacques Dynam as Alex
 Anémone as Cécile
 Jean Rougerie as Cécile's father
 Michel Galabru as The farmer
 Laurence Badie as The farmer
 Audrey Dana as The woman in the bed
 Hubert Deschamps as The prisoner
 Luis Rego as The interpreter
 Jacques Mathou
 Diego Abatantuono

References

External links

1980s science fiction comedy films
1985 films
French science fiction comedy films
1980s French-language films
French anthology films
Films based on French comics
Films directed by François Leterrier
Live-action films based on comics
1985 comedy films
1980s French films